Trophic, from Ancient Greek τροφικός (trophikos) "pertaining to food or nourishment", may refer to:

 Trophic cascade
 Trophic coherence
 Trophic egg
 Trophic function
 Trophic hormone
 Trophic level index
 Trophic level
 Trophic mutualism
 Trophic pyramid
 Trophic species
 Trophic state index

See also
 Tropic (disambiguation)